Camille Solyagua (born 1959) is a Portland-based photographer known for her photograms of plants, insects and animals.

Early life and education 
Solyagua was born in Denver, Colorado. She received a Bachelor of Arts in Spanish Literature from University of California, San Diego in 1984, a Master of Arts in Spanish literature from Middlebury College in 1985, and studied at the Academy of Art College between 1989 and 1990.

Style and critical reception 
Many of Solygua's works are photograms  photographs made without a camera. Her photography focusses on the natural world, including plants, animals and insects. In a review of her 2007 exhibition at the Charles A. Hartman gallery, The Oregonian noted that each of her photos was made in a darkroom with no camera and unlike photographs that can be endlessly reproduced, each was "one-of-a-kind". The review also described her work as "spiritual but unromantic" and "[having] an unflinchingly scientific eye". A 1997 New York Times review of a group exhibition at the Candace Perich Gallery described her photographs as "emphasis on design and symmetry with an eye toward the fantastic".

Career 
Solyagua is based in Portland, Oregon.

Collections 
Photographs by Solyagua are in the collections of the Museum of Fine Arts, Houston, the Santa Barbara Museum of Art, and the Los Angeles County Museum of Art.

References

External links 
 

American women photographers
1959 births
Artists from Denver
Living people
University of California, San Diego alumni
Middlebury College alumni
Academy of Art University alumni